Saint Spyridon Church is a Romanian Orthodox church located at 41 Tăbăcari Street in Focșani, Romania. It is dedicated to Saint Spyridon.

The church was built in 1820–1826. It is listed as a historic monument by Romania's Ministry of Culture and Religious Affairs.

Notes

Religious buildings and structures in Focșani
Historic monuments in Vrancea County
Romanian Orthodox churches in Vrancea County
Churches completed in 1826